Total 911 is an international magazine devoted to the  Porsche 911 sports car, from 1963 to the present day. It is published monthly in the UK by Future plc and currently edited by Lee Sibley.

Launched in 2005 by Rob Mugglestone, Philip Raby and John Francas (under 9 Publishing Ltd), Total 911 is a niche publication, covering mainly the 911 model in Porsche's range. The three decided to launch a magazine that had editorial depth and accuracy with the coffee-table design quality of lifestyle magazines.

Total 911 Magazine was sold to Imagine Publishing in 2008, and has continued to grow and develop its reputation in the automotive journalism sector. It is sold through newsagents and subscribers worldwide in nearly 100 countries.

In early 2010, Total 911 was released on the Apple iPhone and iPad – a first for a magazine of its type.

Since 2016, this magazine is published by Future Publishing.

References

External links
 

Automobile magazines published in the United Kingdom
Monthly magazines published in the United Kingdom
Magazines established in 2005